The Caffort 12Aa was a 12-cylinder, horizontally-opposed, piston aircraft engine designed and built in France during the latter half of the 1920s.

Design and development
Having produced automobile and aircraft engine parts under contract during WWI, the Caffort brothers set about the task of producing their own aircraft engine, under a licence from "Bertrand-Solanet", of whom there is very little known, leaving the Caffort 12Aa as a testament.

Built largely from cast Aluminium alloys the 12Aa was a geared engine with four Zenith carburetors supplying mixture to the lower intake valves. Four camshafts at the corners of the crankcase operated two intake valves and two exhaust valves per cylinder, also driving oil pumps and other accessories. The four magnetos were mounted on transverse shafts driven from the crankshaft at the front of the engine. A single water pump was mounted on the rear cover, driven directly from the crankshaft.

Specifications (12Aa)

References

Further reading

1920s aircraft piston engines